Steven Brent Cummings (born July 15, 1964) is an American former professional baseball player.  A pitcher, Cummings played Major League Baseball from 1989 to 1990 with the Toronto Blue Jays.

Cummings attended University of Houston where an associate degree in science.

See also
 Houston Cougars baseball

References

External links

1964 births
Living people
American expatriate baseball players in Canada
American expatriate baseball players in Mexico
Baseball players from Houston
Blinn Buccaneers baseball players
Colorado Springs Sky Sox players
Dunedin Blue Jays players
Houston Cougars baseball players
Knoxville Blue Jays players
Major League Baseball pitchers
Mexican League baseball pitchers
St. Catharines Blue Jays players
Syracuse Chiefs players
Tecolotes de los Dos Laredos players
Toledo Mud Hens players
Toronto Blue Jays players